Adam Pecháček (born 19 February 1995) is a Czech basketball player for Artland Dragons of the ProA and Czech national team.

Professional career
Pecháček spent the 2019–20 season with Phoenix Hagen, averaging 13.5 points, 5.0 rebounds, and 1.1 assists per game.

On October 14, 2020, Pecháček signed with the PS Karlsruhe Lions.

On July 27, 2021, he has signed with Artland Dragons of the ProA.

National team career
He participated at the EuroBasket 2017.

References

1995 births
Living people
Araberri BC players
Artland Dragons players
AZS Koszalin players
Czech expatriate basketball people in Italy
Czech expatriate basketball people in Spain
Czech expatriate basketball people in Poland
Czech men's basketball players
Czech expatriate basketball people in Germany
Liga ACB players
Mitteldeutscher BC players
Obradoiro CAB players
Pallacanestro Reggiana players
Phoenix Hagen players
Power forwards (basketball)
PS Karlsruhe Lions players
Sportspeople from Prague
Virtus Bologna players